Sam Schröder and Niels Vink defeated the defending champions Andy Lapthorne and David Wagner in the final, 6–7(4–7), 6–2, 6–3 to win the quad doubles wheelchair tennis title at the 2022 Wimbledon Championships.

Seeds

Draw

Finals

References

Sources
 Entry List
 Draw

Quad Wheelchair Doubles